Xinzhan is a town in the county-level city of Jiaohe, Jilin, China.

Xinzhan is divided into 1 residential community and 31 administrative villages.

History 
During the Qing Dynasty, a relay station named Lafa Relay Station moved to the area, and was colloquially known as "Xinzhan" (lit. new station).

From June 8 through June 10, 1946, Kuomintang (KMT) forces fought Chinese Communist Party forces in Xinzhan during the conclusion of the battle. The battle ended in Xinzhan, and resulted in the defeat of KMT forces.

The area was organized as a bao in 1933, and was re-organized as a street in 1938, and as a town in 1954. Xinzhan was re-organized as a people's commune in 1958, and was reverted to a town in 1985. Longfeng Township was merged into Xinzhan in 2001.

At 2018, two of the town's residential communities, Xinyi and Xinyue were merged as one, called Xinyu.

Geography 
The town is located in the Xinzhan basin, with Mount Dahuangdingzi to the east, Mount Laoye to the northwest, and Mount Lafa to the south. The town's tallest mountain is Mount Xitu with the altitude of 1189.3 m. The town is largely forested, and has three forest farms: Pingchuan, Longfeng, Laoyeling. The town is located in the Changbai Mountains.

Longfeng River flows in the town's east, Laoyeling River flows through the west, and Minzhu River flows through the north. In the town's south, they converge, forming the Lafa River, which eventually flows into Songhua Lake.

Demographics 
As of 2018, Xinzhan has a hukou population of 33,787.

As of 2012, Xinzhan had a population of 44,569 people, among them has 20,311 people is citizens.

As of the 2000 Chinese Census, Xinzhan had a population of 39,629.

Administrative divisions 
Xinzhan has 1 residential community and 31 administrative villages.
Communities: Xinyu
Villages: Shimenzi, Baoshan, Shuangwang, Changyou, Shuangdingzi, Jiliang, Fu'an, Longfeng, Lengfengkou, Bao'an, Kaoshan, Zhenzhu, Pingyuan, Fuxing, Yangyu, Donggou, Chaoyang, Liujiazi, Wujiazi, Jixiang, Laoyeling, Bei'an, Xiaogujia, Dali, Wenhua, Henan, Aihe, Renhe, Xinzhan, Shucai, Xinxian

Transport 
The Lafa–Harbin railway and Jilin Provincial Highway 204 both pass through the town. The  serves as a stop on the Lafa-Harbin railway.

References 

Geography of Jilin